Chengdu Neusoft University (abbreviated CNU, Chinese: 成都东软学院) was founded by Neusoft Holdings in 2003 and is located in Dujiangyan, Chengdu, Sichuan province, China. 

It is the first independent private undergraduate college in the history of Sichuan Province.

Environment
There are many tourist attractions near Chengdu Neusoft University, such as Mount Qingcheng, Jiezi Historic Town, Dujiangyan Irrigation Project and so on.

See also

 Liu Jiren
 Neusoft
 Dalian Neusoft University of Information

References

External links
 Official website 
 Official website 

Universities and colleges in Chengdu
2003 establishments in China
Educational institutions established in 2003
Private universities and colleges in China